

Incumbents
President: Gitanas Nausėda
Prime Minister: Saulius Skvernelis

Events
28 February – The first case of COVID-19 in the country was reported.
16 March – The government declared a quarantine.
18 March – 1st domestic case.
19 March – The first case of community spread was reported.
20 March – The first COVID-19 death in the country was confirmed.

Predicted and Scheduled Events
11 October – 1st round of 2020 Lithuanian parliamentary election.
25 October – 2nd round of 2020 Lithuanian parliamentary election.

Deaths

References

 
2020s in Lithuania
Years of the 21st century in Lithuania
Lithuania
Lithuania